Lee Juck (born February 28, 1974) is a South Korean singer, lyricist, composer and arranger.

Biography 
Lee Juck was born in Seoul and attended Banpo High School. He graduated from Seoul National University with a major in sociology.
He made his debut as a member of Panic with his neighborhood buddy Kim Jin-pyo in 1995 and worked with Kim Dong-ryul as a project band Carnival in 1997. In 1999, he released his first solo album Dead End. His third album 나무로 만든 노래 (Songs Made of Wood) won the 'Album of the Year', 'Song of the Year', 'Best Pop Album' and 'Best Pop Song' from the Korean Music Awards in 2008.

Besides being a musician, Lee is a radio DJ of major radio shows in South Korea, for example, "별이 빛나는 밤에 (At starry night)" of MBC AM (1996–1998), "Ten-Ten Club" of SBS FM (2008–2009) and so on.

In 2005, he published a collection of short fantasy fictions entitled 지문 사냥꾼 (Fingerprint Hunter), and one of the episode 제불찰씨 이야기 (The story of Mr. Self-fault) was made as an animation in 2007.

He featured as a medical doctor of a colorectal surgery clinic in a sitcom TV show High Kick: Revenge of the Short Legged of MBC from 2011.

In December 2007, Lee married Jeong Ok-hee (ballerina). In 2010, Lee and his wife welcomed their first daughter and their second daughter in 2013.

Philanthropy 
On December 6, 2022, Lee donated 50 million won to support the hearing impaired through Snail of Love.

Discography

Studio albums

Singles

Soundtrack appearances

Other charted songs

Filmography

Television series

Television show

Web shows

Bibliography

Awards and nominations

State honors

Notes

See also 
 Music Farm

Notes

References

External links 

 Official site

1974 births
Living people
K-pop singers
Music Farm artists
Singers from Seoul
South Korean pop pianists
South Korean pop rock singers
South Korean radio presenters
Seoul National University alumni
Korean Music Award winners
MAMA Award winners
Male pianists
21st-century South Korean  male singers
21st-century pianists
South Korean male singer-songwriters